The 2009–10 Quaid-e-Azam Trophy was one of two first-class domestic cricket competitions that were held in Pakistan during the 2009–10 season. It was the 52nd edition of the Quaid-e-Azam Trophy, contested by 22 teams representing regional cricket associations and departments, and was followed in the schedule by the Pentangular Cup, contested by the top two regions and departments in the Quaid-e-Azam Trophy and a Rest of Pakistan team.

The format of the competition remained the same as the previous season, with the teams split into two groups of eleven – nine departmental and two regional teams in Group A, and eleven regional teams in Group B – playing four-day matches in a round-robin and a five-day final between the top teams in each group to determine the winner. In a change from 2007–08, the bottom two departmental teams were relegated to the Patron's Trophy (Grade II) competition for the following season.

Karachi Blues beat Habib Bank Limited by 141 runs in the final to win the trophy. In a low scoring match, Habib Bank, chasing a victory target of 208, were bowled out for just 66 runs in the fourth innings.

Group stage
The top teams in the round-robin group stage (highlighted) advanced to the final.

Final

Notes

References

External links
 Series home at ESPN Cricinfo

Domestic cricket competitions in 2009–10
2009 in Pakistani cricket
Pakistani cricket seasons from 2000–01
2009–10 Quaid-e-Azam Trophy